Robert "Bob" Boucher (March 23, 1938 – December 16, 2004) was a Canadian ice hockey player and coach.

Career 
Boucher is best known for coaching the Saint Mary's Huskies for 13 years, leading the Huskies to four straight national championship games. He served as an assistant coach of the Philadelphia Flyers for two seasons under head coach Pat Quinn. He died at age 66 after a short battle with lung cancer.

References

External links

The Bob Boucher Hockey Assistance Fund

1938 births
2004 deaths
Canadian ice hockey coaches
Canadian ice hockey right wingers
Chicoutimi Saguenéens (QMJHL) players
Philadelphia Flyers coaches
Ice hockey people from Ottawa